Ascheberg (Holst) station is a railway station in the municipality of Ascheberg (Holstein), located in the Plön district in Schleswig-Holstein, Germany.

Notable places nearby
Großer Plöner See

References

Railway stations in Schleswig-Holstein
Buildings and structures in Plön (district)